Parastomonema is a genus of nematodes belonging to the family Siphonolaimidae.

The species of this genus are found in Portugal.

Species:

Parastomonema fijiensi 
Parastomonema papillosum

References

Nematodes